Charlton House is a Jacobean building in Charlton, within the Royal Borough of Greenwich in south-east London. Originally it was a residence for a nobleman associated with the Stuart royal family. It later served as a wartime hospital, then a museum and library, and is now a community centre.

History
The house was built in 1607–12 of red brick with stone dressing, and has an "H"-plan layout. The interior features contemporary staircases, panelled rooms, ornamental ceilings and chimney pieces.

It was built by the crown to house Sir Adam Newton and his royal charge. He was then Dean of Durham and tutor to Prince Henry, the son of James I, and older brother of the future Charles I. Greenwich Palace, where their mother lived much of the time, was nearby.  But the prince died almost as soon as the house was finished, in 1612. Newton became Receiver-General, sold his office as dean, and in 1620 became a baronet.

The diarist John Evelyn, who knew the house and was well acquainted with Newton's son, Sir Henry Newton, stated that the house had been built for Prince Henry. Because of Sir Adam's court connections, the designer of the house is often presumed to be John Thorpe, one of the first professional English architects, who had served as Clerk of Works for the royal palace at nearby Greenwich – the Palace of Placentia. Thorpe had left the Office of Works in 1601 for private practice. Other royal connections are seen at Charlton House in the form of the Prince of Wales's feathers above the east door to the hall and in the saloon, where there is also the royal monogram, "JR" (for James I); the royal Stuart coat of arms in the west bay; and the Garter and Prince of Wales's motto, "Ich Dien" in the east bay.

The garden house, or orangery, which has been converted into a public toilet, is optimistically attributed to Inigo Jones, who is not otherwise connected with the house. It is a Grade I listed building. Behind the orangery is a mulberry tree said to be the oldest of its species (Morus nigra) in the country, and has been afforded Great Tree of London status. It is thought to have been planted in 1608 at the order of James I. Giacomo Castelvetro, an Italian writer stayed at Charlton and in 1613 wrote a treatise on fruit and vegetables.

Adam Newton died in 1629 and his executors Peter Newton and the Scottish architect David Cunningham of Auchenharvie rebuilt nearby St Luke's Church. Anne, Lady Halkett was married in 1656 at Charlton House, the service was conducted in her brother-in-law Sir Henry Newton's closet by Mr Robert Gale, the chaplain of Christian Cavendish, Countess of Devonshire.

In 1658 the estate was purchased by Sir William Ducie; on his death, in 1680, it was bought by Sir William Langhorne. It passed to his nephew, Sir John Conyers, in 1715, and remained in the family (being inherited by Jane (née Weller), the wife of Sir Thomas Spencer Wilson, in 1777). Under their grandson Sir Thomas Maryon Wilson a wing was added to the house by Norman Shaw, in 1877. 

During World War I, Charlton House was the divisional headquarters of the Red Cross for Greenwich and Woolwich. At the end of the war London's hospitals couldn't cope with the numbers of wounded, so Sir Spencer and Lady Maryon-Wilson made the entire house available to the Red Cross to serve as an auxiliary hospital; it operated from 14 October 1918 to 30 April 1919, with around 70 beds.

In 1925 Sir Spencer sold the house and grounds to the Metropolitan Borough of Greenwich. The Chapel Wing was bombed during the Blitz and was subsequently rebuilt albeit with non-matching bricks such as were available in the immediate post-war period. Formerly housing a museum and library, the house is now a community centre, and much of the former pleasure grounds now forms Charlton Park, although remnants of the house gardens survive as does a short section of Ha-Ha.

The walled gardens and some of the perennial borders were redesigned and re-planted by the landscape designer Andrew Fisher Tomlin in 2003–2004 for the then London, now Royal Borough of Greenwich with perennial meadow planting to the main walled kitchen garden retaining three ancient Prunus app. trees. One of the spaces includes an Amnesty International Peace Garden with planting also designed by Fisher Tomlin. The house is looked after by Royal Greenwich Heritage Trust.

Film location
In 1996 the house was the main location for the feature film Monarch, released in 2000, produced and directed by local film maker John Walsh.

References

External links 
Royal Greenwich Heritage Trust

Charlton, London
Grade I listed buildings in the Royal Borough of Greenwich
Grade I listed houses in London
Houses in the Royal Borough of Greenwich
Houses completed in 1612
1612 establishments in England
Buildings and structures in the Royal Borough of Greenwich
Country houses in London
Health in the Royal Borough of Greenwich
Hospitals established in 1918
Defunct hospitals in London
Hospitals disestablished in 1919